Pendleton High School (PHS) is a public high school located in Pendleton, Oregon, United States.

Pendleton photographer Walter S. Bowman photographed some of the school's teams in the early 20th century.

Academics
In 2008, 92% of the school's seniors received a high school diploma. Of 208 students, 192 graduated, nine dropped out, one received a modified diploma, and six were still in high school the following year.

Notable alumni
 George Christensen, former NFL player
 Bob Lilly, nicknamed "Mr. Cowboy", former defensive tackle for the Dallas Cowboys, photographer, and member of the Pro Football Hall of Fame
 Roy Schuening, former NFL player
Dan Straily (born 1988), starting pitcher in the Philadelphia Phillies organization (grades 9-10)
 Mark Temple, former NFL player

References

External links
 Official website

Buildings and structures in Pendleton, Oregon
High schools in Umatilla County, Oregon
Public high schools in Oregon